Players and pairs who neither have high enough rankings nor receive wild cards may participate in a qualifying tournament held one week before the annual Wimbledon Tennis Championships.

Seeds

  Bryan Shelton (qualified)
  Dimitri Poliakov (first round)
  Alexander Mronz (qualified)
  Doug Flach (qualifying competition, lucky loser)
  Sébastien Lareau (qualified)
  Brent Larkham (first round)
  Sandon Stolle (first round)
  Daniel Nestor (first round)
  Michael Tebbutt (qualified)
  Simon Youl (qualified)
  Neil Borwick (qualifying competition)
  Kevin Ullyett (second round)
  Michael Joyce (first round)
  Jonathan Canter (qualified)
  Martin Blackman (first round)
  Mark Kaplan (second round)
  Arne Thoms (qualified)
  Todd Woodbridge (first round)
  Vince Spadea (second round)
  David Nainkin (qualifying competition)
  Mark Knowles (qualified)
  Fernon Wibier (first round)
  Leander Paes (qualifying competition)
  Paul Wekesa (second round)
  Peter Tramacchi (second round)
  Albert Chang (second round)
  Emilio Benfele Álvarez (first round)
  Paul Kilderry (first round)
  David Witt (qualified)
  Lionel Barthez (qualifying competition)
  Roger Smith (tennis) (first round)
  Lars Rehmann (second round)

Qualifiers

  Bryan Shelton
  José Francisco Altur
  Alexander Mronz
  David Witt
  Sébastien Lareau
  Grant Connell
  Christian Saceanu
  Ellis Ferreira
  Michael Tebbutt
  Simon Youl
  Kenny Thorne
  Mark Knowles
  John Fitzgerald
  Jonathan Canter
  Laurence Tieleman
  Arne Thoms

Lucky loser
  Doug Flach

Qualifying draw

First qualifier

Second qualifier

Third qualifier

Fourth qualifier

Fifth qualifier

Sixth qualifier

Seventh qualifier

Eighth qualifier

Ninth qualifier

Tenth qualifier

Eleventh qualifier

Twelfth qualifier

Thirteen qualifier

Fourteenth qualifier

Fifteenth qualifier

Sixteenth qualifier

External links

 1994 Wimbledon Championships – Men's draws and results at the International Tennis Federation

Men's Singles Qualifying
Wimbledon Championship by year – Men's singles qualifying